Siim-Tanel Sammelselg (born May 13, 1993 in Tallinn) is an Estonian ski jumper.

Sammelselg competed at the 2014 Winter Olympics for Estonia. He placed 51st in the normal hill qualifying round, failing to advance, and 49th in the large hill qualifying round, also failing to advance.

Sammelselg made his World Cup debut in November 2007. As of September 2014, his best finish is 9th, in a team event at Lahti in 2011–12. His best individual finish is 45th, at a large hill event at Sapporo in 2013–14.

References

1993 births
Living people
Olympic ski jumpers of Estonia
Ski jumpers at the 2014 Winter Olympics
Sportspeople from Tallinn
Estonian male ski jumpers